The twelfth election to Cardiganshire County Council took place in March 1928. It was preceded by the 1925 election and followed by the 1931 election.

Candidates
After a period of bitter Liberal infighting in Cardiganshire politics in the early 1920s, a far less dramatic era ensued and in 1928 only ten seats were contested, the same number as three years earlier. This resulted in 40 members were returned without a contest.

Retiring aldermen

Eight aldermen retired, but only Meredith Gwarnant Williams (Llanwenog) stood as a candidate in the election.

Gains and losses

Very few seats changed hands.

Contested elections

Only ten seats were contested and these were not largely fought on political lines.

Outcome

Very little change took place as a result of an election in which only one sitting member lost his seat.

Results

Aberaeron

Aberbanc

Aberporth

Aberystwyth Division 1

Aberystwyth Division 2

Aberystwyth Division 3

Aberystwyth Division 4

Aberystwyth Division 5

Aberystwyth Division 6

Aeron
}

Borth

Bow Street

Cardigan North

Cardigan South

Cilcennin

Cwmrheidol

Devil's Bridge

Felinfach

Goginan

Lampeter Borough

Llanarth

Llanbadarn Fawr

Llanddewi Brefi

Llandygwydd

Llandysul North

Llandysul South

Llansysiliogogo

Llanfair Clydogau
The seat was held in 1925 by Tom Davies (Conservative).

Llanfarian

Llanfihangel y Creuddyn

Llangoedmor

Llangeitho

Llangrannog

Llanilar

Llanrhystyd

Llanllwchaiarn

Llansantffraed

Llanwnen

Llanwenog

Lledrod

Nantcwnlle

New Quay

Penbryn

Strata Florida

Taliesin

Talybont

Trefeurig

Tregaron

Troedyraur

Ysbyty Ystwyth

Election of Aldermen
Eight aldermen were elected, including the long-serving member, C.M. Williams, who had not faced the electorate for many years and two other retiring aldermen, Josiah T. Jones and Richard Evans who had last fought an election six years previously. Four new aldermen elected at the recent election were elevated while Dr John James had filled a vacnany following the death of J.T. Morgan some years previously. The only retiring alderman who had sought election (Meredith Gwarnant Williams) was not among those appointed for the next six years.

John Evans, Aberystwyth
C. M. Williams, Aberystwyth
Dr J. James, Borth
D.L. Herbert, Llangeitho
Simon Davies, Felinfach
Dr Evan Evans, Lampeter
Josiah T. Jones, Llandyssul
Richard Evans, Llangoedmor

By-elections
Five by-elections were held following the election of aldermen. At Tregaron, Mary Lloyd became the first woman elected to Cardiganshire County Council when she was returned unopposed. Dr Evan Jones, who had unsuccessfully stood against Meredith Gwarnant Williams at Llanwenog, was returned unopposed at the by-election. Three wards were contested but no party allegiances were declared.

Cilcennin by-election

Llandysul North by-election

Llangoedmor by-election

Llanwenog by-election

Tregaron by-election

References

1928
1928 Welsh local elections
20th century in Ceredigion